Eucalyptus torquata, commonly known as coral gum or Coolgardie gum, is an endemic tree of Western Australia. The species is cultivated for use in gardens and as a street tree.

Description
A tree, small and stout in form, with beautiful flowers. It produces clusters of orange barrel-shaped buds with horned caps, which are followed by prolific red or pink flowers between August and December. The bark is rough and is persistent on the trunk and branches. The bark is fibrous-flaky box type grey-black, grey or black colour bark with whitish patches. The leaves are basally tapered, the petioles are quadrangular or narrowly flattened or channelled. They are simple and axillary with three to seven flowered umbellasters with terete peduncles. The buds have a rostrate or urceolate shape and are not pruinose, the calyx calyptrate sheds early. The fruits that form later have a cylindrical shape with a depressed disc and enclosed valves.

Taxonomy
The species was first formally described by the botanist Johann George Luehmann in 1897 in Victorian Naturalist. The type specimen was collected by W.A. Macpherson from near Coolgardie.

The species name  torquata is taken from the latin word torquatus meaning having a twisted ring or collar. This refers to the corrugated structure found at the base of the buds and fruit.

Amongst the common names of the species is the use of Christmas tree, given for flowers that appear in December, and Goldfields red flowering gum for the region's mining operations.

Distribution

It is found on hillsides around Kalgoorlie and Coolgardie, and south to about Widgiemooltha in the Goldfields region of Western Australia where it grows in stony loam or clay and red sandy soils.

Uses 
Coral gum is commonly cultivated for small gardens and for use as an ornamental or as a street tree, especially in arid areas. Flowering often occurs in 2 years from seed. It can be grown in large containers in well-drained soils.

See also

List of Eucalyptus species
Lemon-flowered Mallee (Eucalyptus woodwardii and Torwood hybrids)

References

Eucalypts of Western Australia
Trees of Australia
Trees of Mediterranean climate
torquata
Myrtales of Australia
Plants described in 1897